Swaran Lata or Swaranlata may refer to:

 Swaran Lata (singer), a Punjabi singer of Indian Punjab
 Swaran Lata (actress), a Pakistani actress